Rossiysky Kredit (OJSC Bank Rossiysky Kredit) was a Russian commercial bank that ceased operations on 24 July 2015, when the Central Bank of Russia withdrew the bank's license.

Rossiysky Kredit was established as a mutual bank in 1991 by ex-Prime Minister of Georgia, billionaire Bidzina Ivanishvili and his partner, former Russian Federation Council member Vitaly Malkin. By 1996, it was the seventh largest bank in Russia, as measured by assets.  In 1997 it was converted into a joint stock company. Because of the 1998 Russian financial crisis, Rossiysky Kredit became insolvent and lost much of its deposits. In 1999 the bank came under the control of the Agency for Restructuring Credit Organizations (ARKO, the predecessor of the Deposit Insurance Agency of Russia). In 2003 Rossiysky Kredit emerged from restructuring and passed out of ARKO control. In 2011, Rossiysky Kredit became part of the Russian bank deposit insurance system. In 2012, Bidzina Ivanishvili sold 99.61% of shares in the bank to a group of investors headed by Anatoly Motylev.

Examinations carried out on the eve of the Central Bank's license revocation found that the bank's funds were applied in the interests of owners and related companies, and that more than half of the loan portfolio consisted of doubtful debts. The State's costs arising from the bank failure was estimated at 57 Billion Rubles, making it the fifth most costly Russian bank default.

In 2020, Anatoly Motylev was declared bankrupt in London, in 2022 - in Switzerland. Thus, Russian creditors received hope to get to his assets. In total, Motylev owes about 40 billion rubles, 35 of them to Rossiysky Kredit.

References

Defunct banks of Russia
Banks established in 1991
1991 establishments in Russia
Companies based in Moscow